Diakon  is a town and commune in the Cercle of Bafoulabé in the Kayes Region of western Mali. In the 2009 census the commune had a population of 34,100.

References

External links
 Diakon at csa-mali.org

Communes of Kayes Region